Mark Mitchell (born September 1, 2003) is an American college basketball player for the Duke Blue Devils in the Atlantic Coast Conference (ACC).

Early life and high school
Mitchell grew up in Kansas City, Kansas and initially attended Bishop Miege High School. He averaged 21.6 points, 8.7 rebounds, 2.7 assists, and 1.8 blocks per game as a sophomore. Mitchell won the DiRenna Award as the top player in the Kansas City area after averaging 18 points and six rebounds per game as Bishop Miege won the Kansas Class 4A state championship. He transferred to Sunrise Christian Academy in Bel Aire, Kansas prior to the beginning of his senior year. Mitchell averaged 17.6 points with 6.3 rebounds per game in his only year at Sunrise Christian. He played in the 2022 McDonald's All-American Boys Game and tied as the game's leading scorer with 19 points. Mitchell was also named a second-team All-American by Sports Illustrated as a senior.

Recruitment
Mitchell was rated a five-star prospect by Rivals.com and 247Sports and a four-star recruit by ESPN. Mitchell committed to play college basketball at Duke while considering offers from Kansas, Missouri, and UCLA.

College career
Mitchell entered his freshman season at Duke as a starter at forward.

Career statistics

College

|-
| style="text-align:left;"| 2022–23
| style="text-align:left;"| Duke
| 34 || 34 || 27.0 || .474 || .365 || .763 || 4.4 || 1.2 || .6 || .5 || 9.1
|- class="sortbottom"
| style="text-align:center;" colspan="2"| Career
|| 34 || 34 || 27.0 || .474 || .365 || .763 || 4.4 || 1.2 || .6 || .5 || 9.1

References

External links
Duke Blue Devils bio
ESPN profile

2003 births
Living people
American men's basketball players
Basketball players from Kansas
Duke  Blue Devils men's basketball players
Power forwards (basketball)
Sportspeople from Kansas City, Kansas
McDonald's High School All-Americans